Nicușor Silviu Bancu (born 18 September 1992) is a Romanian professional footballer who plays as a left-back or a midfielder for Liga I club CS Universitatea Craiova, which he
captains, and the Romania national team

Club career
Bancu recorded his competitive debut for CS Universitatea Craiova on 16 July 2014, a 0–1 Cupa Ligii loss to Rapid București. His first Liga I match came nine days later in a 1–1 home draw with Pandurii Târgu Jiu.

He scored his first goal for the Alb-albaștrii on 9 September that year, in a 2–0 defeat of Universitatea Cluj. 29 October, Bancu was injured by Viitorul Constanța player Alin Șeroni in a Cupa României Round of 16 game, which ended 1–1 after 90 minutes. He suffered a broken tibia and was sidelined for around half a year.

Bancu made 34 appearances in all competitions in the following season, as his team finished on the eighth place in the domestic league.

In 2019, it was announced that Lazio are keen on bringing Craiova captain Bancu to Stadio Olimpico. They have been monitoring his progress over the past few seasons. Former Biancocelesti captain, Cristiano Bergodi, likened Bancu to Senad Lulić. Earlier, in 2016, Universitatea Craiova rejected an offer from PSV Eindhoven for Bancu.

Career statistics

International

Scores and results list Romania's goal tally first, score column indicates score after each Bancu goal.

Honours
Universitatea Craiova
Cupa României: 2017–18, 2020–21
Supercupa României: 2021; runner-up: 2018

Individual
Liga I Team of the Season: 2020–21, 2021–22

References

External links

Universitatea Craiova official profile 

1992 births
Living people
People from Olt County
Romanian footballers
Association football midfielders
Liga I players
Liga II players
FC Olt Slatina players
CS Universitatea Craiova players
Romania international footballers